Ypsolopha aurata is a moth of the family Ypsolophidae. It is known from Japan.

The wingspan is 16–17 mm.

References

Ypsolophidae
Moths of Japan